McCaughey is an Irish surname.  Spelling variations include: McHaughey, MacCaughey, McGaughey and O'Coffey, among others.  Modern spelling comes from the original Mac hEochaidh.

The McCaugheys are descendants of the ancient Dál Fiatach dynasty, rulers of the Ulaid. They trace their descent from Fiatach Finn mac Dáire, a King of Ulster and High King of Ireland in the 1st century AD. The McCaughey Family originated from Ireland in the 19th century as a travelling family, part of the traveling community that were spread around Ireland in County Louth, County Limerick, County Cork, and County Antrim.

People
 Billy McCaughey (1950–2006), convict
 Cecil McCaughey (born 1909), English footballer
 Davis McCaughey (1914–2005), scholar, administrator and politician
 Gerald T. McCaughey (born 1956), executive
 John McCaughey (1840–1928), Irish-born Australian pastoralist, brother of Samuel and namesake of the John McCaughey Memorial Art Prize
 Martha McCaughey (born 1966), academic
 Martin McCaughey (1967–1990), Irish Republican Army member
 McCaughey septuplets (born 1997), septuplets born in Des Moines, Iowa
 Patrick McCaughey (born 1942)
 R. H. McCaughey (1860–1906), politician
 Samuel McCaughey (1835–1919), Irish-born Australian pastoralist, politician and philanthropist, brother of John
 Scott McCaughey, singer
 Seán McCaughey (1915–1946), Irish Republican Army leader
 William McCaughey (1929–2000), American sound engineer
 Winsome McCaughey (born 1943)
 Ross McCaughey (born 2004)

See also
 John McCaughey Prize, an Australian art prize awarded to an artist or artists
 Haughey
 Dál Fiatach, a Gaelic dynastic-grouping
 McKeogh

Surnames of Irish origin
Anglicised Irish-language surnames